Palaeodocosia is a genus of flies belonging to the family Mycetophilidae.

The species of this genus are found in Europe and Northern America.

Species:
 Palaeodocosia alpicola (Strobl, 1895) 
 Palaeodocosia brachypezoides (Meunier, 1904)

References

Mycetophilidae